John Timlin is a theatre producer, literary agent and was the administrator of the Australian Performing Group in Melbourne.

At the time Timlin was requested to invest in the APG, he ran a business in North Melbourne manufacturing weighbridges.

After locating a desirable venue in Carlton's leafy Drummond St, to serve as a possible new base for the APG, Graeme Blundell approached Timlin for financing the property in 1970. Timlin agreed and took out a three-year lease on the property for $100 a week. The existing structure on the property was built in 1912 to originally serve as a livery, since that time it was rumoured to have been a brothel, a German Club, a boxing ring and a dance hall. But most famously, as declared by the fading sign on the building's turret, it had manufactured prams in the 1920s; prompting the inspiration of the moniker The Pram Factory.

Timlin was to oversee the APG through most of its existence, being described as the group's "organiser, administrator and bagman". Notable APG member Bruce Spence said of him, "He did the things we wouldn't stoop to do. He got us the money that gave us the freedom to do what we creatively wanted. He spoke to the bureaucrats. He was the respectable face fronting all us ratbags just wanting to tear the place apart.". Another prominent APG member, Kerry Dwyer described Timlin as one of the "Irish heavies" in the group who "ran the office from the pub". Throughout his time with the APG, he was involved in a variety of roles for many of the productions, including construction, set design, producing and is credited as a co-creator of the outside production of 'Goodbye Ted' with Jack Hibberd and 'The Dudders' with John Romeril. He was involved in the founding of an APG label, Pram Factory Productions, which co-financed the 1979 film adaptation of Hibberd's 1969 hit Dimboola. The Almost Managing Company, which acted as both literary and actors' agency for people involved with the APG, was another enterprise.

After the demise of the APG in 1981, Timlin continued to work with various ex-members of the group, including producing the musical adaptation of Manning Clark's The History of Australia and many satirical live shows with Max Gillies such as A Night With The Right, The Max Gillies Summit and A Night of National Reconciliation culminating in packaging The Gillies Report for ABC television. He continued his work as director of the Almost Managing Company till its sale to Bryson Investments. In recent years Timlin has delivered much documentation regarding his work in the theatre to various museums and libraries while still working as a literary agent and editor.

Notes

References 
Blundell, G. (1997). Australian theatre: backstage with Graeme Blundell. Melbourne: Oxford University Press.
Blundell, G. (2008). The Naked Truth: A Life in Parts. Sydney: Hachette Australia.
Ingleton, S. (n.d.). Australian Theatre History. Retrieved from The Australian Performing Group at the Pram Factory: http://www.pramfactory.com
Oakley, B. (2012). Mug Shots: a memoir. Kent Town: Wakefield Press
Parsons, P. (Ed.). (1995). A Companion to Theatre in Australia. Paddington, NSW, Australia: Currency Press.
Robertson, T.(2001) The Pram Factory: The Australian Performing Group Recollected, Melbourne University Press
Wolf, G. (2011) Make It Australian - The Australian Performing Group, Pram Factory & New Wave Theatre: Currency Press

Australian theatre managers and producers
Literary agents
Living people
Year of birth missing (living people)